Raghtin More is a mountain in Inishowen, County Donegal, Ireland.

Geography 
The mountain is part of Inishowen peninsula and is the 557th highest in Ireland.

History 
On the mountain summit stands a megalithic cairn.

Access to the summit 

Raghtin More summit can be reached with a medium walk from Mamore Gap. From the top of the mountain there is a view of the coast stretching till to Malin Head.

References 

Mountains and hills of County Donegal
Marilyns of Ireland